Mónica Pérez de las Heras (born 1965) is a Spanish journalist, writer, and teacher, the director of the European School of Oratory.

Biography
With a licentiate in information sciences from the Complutense University of Madrid, Mónica Pérez de las Heras began her career as an environmental journalist, during which time she wrote four books on the subject. She also has the title of personal coach and master practitioner in neuro-linguistic programming.

She later focused her work on oratory and its teaching. In 2012 she founded the European School of Oratory (EEO) in Madrid. This work has been complemented by the publication of twelve books, including two on Barack and Michelle Obama.

In addition to her public speaking courses and workshops, she is a featured speaker for Thinking Heads. Her TikTok videos on overcoming fear and public speaking are popular.

Publications

On the environment
 La Conservación de la naturaleza (1997), 
 La Guía del Ecoturismo (1999), 
 La Cumbre de Johannesburgo (2002), 
 Manual del Turismo Sostenible (2004),

On communication and oratory
 El secreto de Obama (2009), 
 ¿Estás comunicando? (2010), 
 Palabra de Primera Dama. Michelle Obama (2011), 
 Escribe, Habla, Seduce (2013), 
 Comunicación y Oratoria con PNL e Inteligencia Emocional (2015), 
 Oratoria con PNL para Profesionales del Derecho (2016), 
 PNL para Directivos (2016), 
 PNL para Escritores de Discursos (2016), 
 PNL para Maestros y Profesores (2016), 
 PNL para Periodistas (2016), 
 PNL para Profesionales de la Salud (2016), 
 Programación Neurolingüística para Políticos (2016), 
 Oratoria con PNL: Claves de inteligencia emocional y programación neurolingüística para hablar en público (2018), 
 100 actividades para hablar en público en el aula: Oratoria para colegios e institutos (2021),

Notes

References

External links

 
 TikTok: mpdelasheras

1965 births
21st-century Spanish women writers
Communication skills training
Complutense University of Madrid alumni
Living people
Neuro-linguistic programming writers
Spanish journalists
Spanish women academics
Spanish women journalists
Writers from Madrid